Faisal Ben Said (born 20 September 1990), better known by his stage name Fais, stylized as FÄIS, is a Dutch singer-songwriter and pianist from Rotterdam. His debut single "Hey" featuring Afrojack was released on 8 April 2016 on Wall Recordings. Within the week of its release it peaked at #2 in the Dutch charts, has achieved 8× platinum worldwide and has been listed #5 song in 25 years of Radio 538.

His follow-up single "Used to Have It All" was again a collaboration with Afrojack and achieved triple platinum status in the Netherlands. He released his second solo single "Know You Better" which became Radio 538's Alarmschijf (which is the official Dutch "Record Of The Week") on the day it got released. As well for his third solo single "Make Me Do".

FÄIS has been awarded for Top 40 Best New Act 2016, Top 40 Most Successful Dutch Act alongside Afrojack and is named Most Successful Male Singer of 2018 so far according to Top 40.

Songwriting credits 
As lead artist
 2016 – "Hey" by FÄIS ft. Afrojack (#1 most played song on Dutch radio, Radio 538 Dance Smash and peaked at #8 Single Top 100)
 2016 – "Used to Have It All" by FÄIS and Afrojack (#3 most played song on Dutch radio and Radio 538 Alarmschijf)
 2017 – "Ask Me Tomorrow"
2018 – "Know You Better" (#1 most played song on Dutch radio, Radio 538 Alarmschijf and peaked at #8 Top 40)
2018 – "Make Me Do" (Radio 538 Alarmschijf)
2019 – "I Want You Now"
2021 – "Love You More"

As songwriter
 2016 – "Follow Your Dreams" by Afrojack (co-written with Ne-Yo)
 2016 – "To the World" by DANCE EARTH PARTY ft. Afrojack
 2017 – "Another Life" by Afrojack & David Guetta ft. Ester Dean (#1 Tipparade, #28 Top 40 and Radio 538 Alarmschijf)
 2017 – "Wave Your Flag" by Afrojack ft. Luis Fonsi (RIAA Latin Gold Certified on Feb 25th, 2020)
 2017 – "Break into the Dark" by Valentine ft. Rui & Afrojack (official soundtrack for HiGH&LOW The Movie 2: END OF SKY)
 2017 – "Wasted Love" by Hiroomi Tosaka (#1 Japan Billboard Buzz Songs, #5 Japan Billboard Hot 100, RIAJ: Platinum as a part of the JSB album "FUTURE")
 2017 – "Diamond Sunset" by Hiroomi Tosaka (#1 Recochoku TOP, RIAJ: Platinum as a part of the JSB album "FUTURE")
 2017 – "A Million Ways" by Miss Montreal (#5 most played song on Dutch radio, #9 Tipparade and #26 Top 40)
 2017 – "New Memories" by DubVision & Afrojack (#8 Tipparade and Radio 538 Dance Smash)
 2018 – "Luxe" by Hiroomi Tosaka ft. Crazyboy (RIAJ: Platinum as a part of the JSB album "FUTURE")
 2018 – "Smile Moon Night" by Hiroomi Tosaka (RIAJ: Platinum as a part of the JSB album "FUTURE")
 2018 – "End of Line" by Hiroomi Tosaka (RIAJ: Platinum as a part of the JSB album "FUTURE")
 2018 – "Smile Moon Night" by Hiroomi Tosaka (RIAJ: Platinum as a part of the JSB album "FUTURE")
 2018 – "Hey" by Hiroomi Tosaka ft. Afrojack (RIAJ: Platinum as a part of the JSB album "FUTURE")
2018 – "Till The Sun Comes Up" by Miss Montreal
2018 – "Own Game" by Afrojack & Chasner
2019 – "Red Lemonade" by Miss Montreal
2022 – "LOKO" by Christian Pagán from "American Song Contest" (Qualifier Winner, #6 iTunes Top 100 Latin Songs)
As executive producer

 2022 – "LOKO" by Christian Pagán from "American Song Contest" (Qualifier Winner, #6 iTunes Top 100 Latin Songs)

Production and co-production credits 

 2018 – "End of Line" by Hiroomi Tosaka (produced by FÄIS & Afrojack) (RIAJ: Platinum as a part of the JSB album "FUTURE")
 2018 – "Till The Sun Comes Up" by Miss Montreal (produced by FÄIS & Gordon Groothedde)
2018 – "Make Me Do" by FÄIS (produced by Afrojack, Johannes Andersson, FÄIS)
2019 – "Red Lemonade" by Miss Montreal (produced by FÄIS & Gordon Groothedde)

Discography

Singles

Appearances

Live shows 
 Afrojack World Tour (2016)
 Tomorrowland (2016 and 2017)
 Tomorrowland Brasil (2016)
 Ultra Music Festival (2016 and 2017)
 First headlining show at Paradiso Noord (2018)

Award shows 
 538 JingleBall hosted by Radio 538 (2015)
 MTV Europe Music Awards hosted by MTV (2016)
 538Live XXL hosted by Radio 538 (2016)
 538 Kingsday (2017)
 538 Kingsday (2018)
100% NL Awards (2018)

TV shows 
 RTL Late Night (2016-2018)
 Holland's Next Top Model (2016)
 NOC*NSF Sportgala 2016 hosted by NOS (2016)

Notes

References

Living people
Dutch musicians
1990 births